Uma Shankari is an Indian actress who appeared in regional Indian language films.

Career
In 2006, she appeared in Sakthi Chidambaram's Kovai Brothers opposite Sibiraj, featuring as Sathyaraj's niece and also featured in Thodamaley alongside newcomers. She also acts in a few serials like Chikamma (the remake of the famous Tamil serial "Chithi" in Kannada) and Valli (a new Tamil Serial).

Personal life
Uma was born to D. Rajendra Babu, a commercial director in Kannada film industry, and actress Sumithra, who appeared in regional Indian films. Her younger sister, Nakshatra, made her debut with the film Doo in 2011. Alongside films, she studied B.A, English literature in Indira Gandhi Open University.

She eventually married software engineer H. Dushyanth in Bangalore on 15 June 2006 and opted against signing any more films thereafter.

Filmography

References 

Indian film actresses
Actresses in Malayalam cinema
Actresses in Tamil cinema
Actresses in Kannada cinema
Living people
Place of birth missing (living people)
Actresses in Telugu cinema
21st-century Indian actresses
Actresses in Tamil television
Actresses in Kannada television
Year of birth missing (living people)